This is a list of various Portuguese warships.

Historical warships

Carracks (C), Naus (N) and galleons (G)
São Gabriel (C) - 1497
 São Rafael (C) - 1497
Flor de la mar (C) - 1502
 Esmeralda (C) - 1503
 Lobo Soares (c.1516)
Santa Catarina do Monte Sinai (C) - 1520
Santo António (C) - 1527
São João Baptista (aka Botafogo) (G) - (c. 1534)
São Bento (C) - Wrecked 1554
 São Paulo - Wrecked 1561?
 Águia - Sank 1559
 Garça - Sank 1559
 Cinco Chagas (1560/61)
 São Martinho (G) - Flagship of the "Invincible Armada" in 1588
 São Mateus (G) - part of the Portuguese Squadron of the "Invincible Armada"
 São Cristóvão (G) - part of the Portuguese Squadron of the "Invincible Armada"
 São Filipe (1583) (G) - part of the Portuguese Squadron of the "Invincible Armada"
 São Luís (1585) (G) - part of the Portuguese Squadron of the "Invincible Armada"
 São Marcos (1585) (G) - part of the Portuguese Squadron of the "Invincible Armada"
 Santiago (1585) (G) - part of the Portuguese Squadron of the "Invincible Armada"
 São João (1586) (G) - Second flagship of the Portuguese Squadron of the "Invincible Armada"
 São Bernardo (1586) (G) - part of the Portuguese Squadron of the "Invincible Armada"
 Relíquias (C) - Sank 1587
 São Tomé - Wrecked 1589
 Madre de Deus (C) - Captured by England 1592
 Santo Alberto - Wrecked 1593
 Cinco Chagas (C) - Sank 1594
 Santiago - Captured by the Dutch Republic 1602
 Santo António (G) - In 1615 fleet to India
 Santo Amaro - Wrecked 1620
 Nossa Senhora da Conceição (C) (1620) - Burnt by Algerines 1621
 Santo Alberto (C) - Sank before 1622
 São João Baptista (c. 1621) - Sank 1622
 Santa Teresa de Jesus - Wrecked 1622
 São Carlos - Wrecked 1622
 São José - Wrecked 1622
 São Francisco Xavier (C) - Flagship of 1623 fleet to India, wrecked 1625
 Santa Isabel (C) - In 1623 fleet to India, storm 1624
 Nossa Senhora da Conceição (C) - In 1623 fleet to India, scuttled after damage 1625
 Santo André (G) - In 1623 fleet to India
 Misericórdia (G) - In 1623 fleet to India
 São Simão (G) - In 1623 fleet to India, storm 1624
 Nossa Senhora da Guia - Wrecked 1624
 São Pedro (G)
 São João 366
 Cinco Chagas (C) (c. 1623) - In 1624 fleet to India
 Nossa Senhora da Quietação (C) (c. 1623) - In 1624 fleet to India
 São João (G) - In 1624 fleet to India
 Santa Catarina do Monte Sinai
 Nossa Senhora da Conceição (C/G)
 Nossa Senhora dos Remédios
 Nossa Senhora da Saúde (C)
 Nossa Senhora de Belém - Sank 1635
 Bom Jesus (G) 64/70 (1636)
 Santa Teresa (G) (c. 1637) - Burnt at the Battle of the Downs, 1639
 São Sebastião 54 - Burnt 1639
 Sacramento - Sank 1647
 Santa Luzia 30 - In 1649 fleet to Brazil
 Nossa Senhora da Atalaia - Sank 1647
 São Pedro da Ribeira (G)
 Padre Eterno (G) (1663)
 Santo António de Tana 54 - Sank 169

Sail battleships (ships of the line) from 1678
 Santa Clara 64 (1678) - In 1682 fleet to Italy
 São João de Deus 60 (1691) - Last known service 1706
 Nossa Senhora da Glória 60 (1692) - Discarded 1707
 Nossa Senhora da Graça 60/64 (1694) - Last known service 1708
 Nossa Senhora da Estrela 64 (1694) - Discarded 1722
 Nossa Senhora da Madre de Deus 56/60 (1697) - Discarded 1732
 Nossa Senhora da Encarnação 56 (1698) - Captured in 1711 at the Battle of Rio de Janeiro

Sail battleships (ships of the line) from 1700
Princesa do Céu (c. 1700) - Discarded 1718?
Nossa Senhora de Bettencourt (c. 1700) - Discarded 1701?
Nossa Senhora do Vale (c. 1701) - Discarded 1701?
Nossa Senhora da Conceição 80 (c. 1701) - Discarded 1724?
Nossa Senhora da Assunção 66 (c. 1705) - Discarded 1731?
Nossa Senhora das Portas do Céu de Rosette (c. 1706) - Discarded 1708?
São Jorge, Nossa Senhora das Necessidades 66 (c. 1708) - Discarded 1737?
Nossa Senhora da Conceição (c. 1710) - Discarded 1712?
Santa Ana e São Joaquim (c. 1711) - Discarded 1718?
Nossa Senhora da Piedade 66 (c. 1711) - Discarded 1725?
Nossa Senhora das Angústias (c. 1713) - Discarded 1713?
Nossa Senhora da Palma e São Pedro (c. 1715) - Discarded 1729?
Nossa Senhora do Pilar, o Padre Eterno 70 (c. 1715) - Discarded 1740?
Santa Rosa 66 (1715) - Sank after an explosion 1726
Rainha dos Anjos 54-56 (c. 1716) - Burnt 1722
São Lourenço 58 (c. 1716) - Discarded 1734?
Nossa Senhora da Luz 66 (probably ex-Dutch Daalhem or Prins Friso 64, acquired 1717) - Discarded 1720?
Nossa Senhora do Monte do Carmo 74 (probably ex-Dutch Zeelandia or Gelderland 72, acquired 1717) - Discarded 1724?
Nossa Senhora do Cabo e São Pedro de Alcântara 72 (probably ex-Dutch Zeelandia or Gelderland 72, acquired 1717) - Captured by pirates 1721
Nossa Senhora da Guia 66 (probably ex-Dutch Daalhem or Prins Friso 64, acquired 1717) - Discarded 1719?
Nossa Senhora da Penha de França 70 (c. 1717) - Discarded 1730?
Nossa Senhora Madre de Deus e São João Evangelista 66 (c. 1717) - Discarded 1734?
Nossa Senhora da Atalaia 52 (c. 1719) - Discarded 1733?
Nossa Senhora Madre de Deus e São Francisco Xavier (c. 1720) - Discarded 1732?
Nossa Senhora da Vitória 64 (c. 1720) - Burnt 1730
Nossa Senhora da Oliveira 50-52 (c. 1721) - Discarded 1737?
Nossa Senhora da Nazaré 50 (c. 1721) - BU 1741
Nossa Senhora do Rosário 50 (c. 1723) - Discarded 1740?
Nossa Senhora do Livramento e São Francisco Xavier 66 (c. 1723) - Discarded 1735?
 Nossa Senhora do Livramento 66 (c. 1724)
Santo António 64-74 (c. 1724) - Discarded 1725?
Nossa Senhora da Boa Viagem (c. 1724) - Discarded 1728?
Nossa Senhora das Ondas 58 (c. 1724) - Discarded 1738?
Santa Teresa de Jesus 66 (c. 1724) - Discarded 1735?
Nossa Senhora da Lampadosa 50/64 (c. 1727) - Burnt 1759?
Nossa Senhora da Conceição e Santo António 70? (c. 1728) - Discarded 1734?
Nossa Senhora da Estrela 64 (c. 1729) - Discarded 1736?
Nossa Senhora do Rosário e Santo André 58 (c. 1732) - Burnt 1737
Nossa Senhora da Conceição 74 (c. 1733) - Discarded 1745?
Nossa Senhora da Boa Viagem 60 (c. 1734) - Discarded 1752?
Nossa Senhora da Vitória 74 (1735) - Aground 1746
Nossa Senhora da Esperança 70 (c. 1735) - Discarded 1742?
Nossa Senhora da Arrábida 60-62 (c. 1736) - BU 1744?
Nossa Senhora da Glória 72-74 (c. 1737) - Sunk 1752
Nossa Senhora da Oliveira de Guimarães 52-60 (c. 1737) - Discarded 1747?
Nossa Senhora do Bom Sucesso 50 (c. 1738) - Discarded 1745?
Nossa Senhora do Monte do Carmo 46 (c. 1738) - Discarded 1747?
Nossa Senhora da Penha de França 56 (c. 1739) - Discarded 1750?
Nossa Senhora da Nazaré (c. 1740) - Wrecked? 1740?
Nossa Senhora da Conceição e São João Baptista (c. 1740) - Sold 1745
Nossa Senhora Madre de Deus e Santo António 64 (c. 1740) - Discarded 1749?
São João Baptista (c. 1741) - Discarded 1747? (ex-British?)
São Francisco Xavier e Todo o Bem 50 (c. 1741) - Burnt and BU 1757
Nossa Senhora da Piedade (Nossa Senhora das Mercês) (c. 1742) - Discarded 1754?
Nossa Senhora da Caridade e São Francisco de Paula (c. 1744) - Discarded 1755?
Nossa Senhora da Misericórdia (c. 1744) - Discarded 1754?
Nossa Senhora da Nazaré 60 (c. 1744) - Discarded 1755?
Nossa Senhora das Necessidades 70 (c. 1747) - Discarded 1764?
Nossa Senhora do Vencimento e São José 58 (c. 1748) - Discarded 1764?
São José e Nossa Senhora da Conceição 60-72 (c. 1748) - Discarded 1767?
Nossa Senhora do Livramento e São José 60 (c. 1749) - Discarded 1762?
Nossa Senhora das Brotas 50 (c. 1751) - Discarded 1765?
Nossa Senhora da Conceição e São José 60-72 (c. 1751) - Discarded 1763?
Nossa Senhora da Natividade 50 (c. 1752) - Discarded 1766?
Santo António e Justiça (c. 1752) - Discarded 1766?
Nossa Senhora da Conceição e São Vicente Ferreira 50 (c. 1755) - Discarded 1764?
Nossa Senhora da Assunção 64-66 (c. 1757) - Discarded 1762?
Nossa Senhora da Caridade, São Francisco de Paula e Santo António (c. 1757) - Sold 1788
Nossa Senhora da Ajuda e São Pedro de Alcântara 62-68 (c. 1759) - Rebuilt 1793 and renamed as Princesa da Beira, sold 1834
 Santo António 60 (c. 1760)
Nossa Senhora do Monte do Carmo 74 (c. 1760) - Wrecked 1774
São José e Nossa Senhora das Mercês 54/64 (c. 1761) - Wrecked 1793/94
Nossa Senhora Madre de Deus e São José 62-64 (c. 1761) - Discarded 1780?
Nossa Senhora do Pilar 74 (c. 1763) - Rebuilt 1793 and renamed Conde Dom Henrique, to Brazil 1822
Santo António e São José 64-74 (c. 1763) - Rebuilt 1794 and renamed Infante Dom Pedro, rebuilt 1806 and renamed Martim de Freitas, renamed Pedro I, to Brazil 1822

Nossa Senhora do Bom Sucesso 64-72 (c. 1766) - Rebuilt 1800 and renamed Dom João de Castro, to Brazil 1822
Nossa Senhora de Belém e São José 54 (c. 1766) - BU 1805
São Sebastião 64 (c. 1767) - BU 1832
Nossa Senhora dos Prazeres 62-64 (c. 1767) - Rebuilt and renamed Afonso de Albuquerque 1796/97, to Brazil 1822
Nossa Senhora da Conceição 90 (1771) - Rebuilt and renamed Príncipe Real 1794; to Brazil 1822
Santo Agostinho 72 (ex-Spanish San Agustin 74, captured 1776/77) - Returned 1777
Nossa Senhora do Monte do Carmo 68-74 (c. 1786) - Rebuilt and renamed Medusa 1793, to Brazil 1822?
Coração de Jesus 72-74 (c. 1789) - Rebuilt, renamed Maria I 1793, captured by France 1807, returned c. 1809, wrecked 1810
Rainha de Portugal 74 (c. 1791) - Rebuilt and renamed Cabo de São Vicente 1833, discarded 1848?
Vasco da Gama 74-80 (c. 1792) - To Brazil 1822
Príncipe do Brazil 74 (c. 1802) - BU 1826?
Dom João Sexto 74 (c. 1816) - Renamed Nossa Senhora dos Mártires e de São João, Príncipe Regente, BU 1852
Vasco da Gama 74-80 (c. 1841) - Discarded 1873?
 Assunção 66/70
 São Sebastião 74
 Santa Teresa 50 - renamed Thetis
 Santo António 70
 Golfinho 44
 Amazónia 50
 Pérola 44
 Tritão 44

Steam-screw warships
 Sagres 14 (1858)
 Bartolomeu Dias 28 (1858)
 Estefânia 28 (1859)
 Sá da Bandeira 13 (1862)
 Duque da Terceira 13 (1864)
 Vasco da Gama (1876) - a coast defence battleship

Pátria

Afonso de Albuquerque

1807 Fleet
The following is a list of the Portuguese warships which were lying in the Tagus River, Lisbon, when Lord St Vincent was there in September 1806:

N.B. One 74-gun ship sailed the latter end of August, and Rainha de Portugal arrived. These ships, in general, were said to be in good repair; and as to construction, equal, if not superior to the British.

Source: Nautical Chronicle, Vol. 18 (1807), pp 229–330, The Maritime History Virtual Archives

1808–1899 commissions
The following is a list of the Portuguese warships by type commissioned between 1808 and 1899

1900–2020 commissions
The following is a list of the Portuguese warships by type commissioned between 1900 and 2020

Future Developments
The following are ships that are being built or that will be transferred to the Portuguese Navy:

 6  being built by West Sea Shipyard (Portugal).
 1 Amphibious transport dock based on HNLMS Rotterdam called "Navio Polivalente Logístico".

See also
 Portuguese Navy
 Military history of Portugal

References

Portugal
Naval ships